Carlos Segers (1900-1967) was an Argentine astronomer.

He was an observer of variable stars, and organized amateur astronomers in South America. He founded the 'Argentine Friends of Astronomy Association'.

The crater Segers on the Moon is named after him.

See also
 Asociación Argentina Amigos de la Astronomía

References 
 

1900 births
1967 deaths
Segers, Carlos
Argentine people of German descent